Fordon is a village in the East Riding of Yorkshire, England, near the border with North Yorkshire.

It forms part of the civil parish of Wold Newton.

There is a small church dedicated to St James that is now a Grade II* listed building.

The name Fordon, first attested in the Domesday Book of 1086 as Fordun, Fordune, and Forduna, is thought to come from the Old English words fore ('in front of') and dūn ('hill'). Thus it once meant 'In front of the hill'.

In 1823 Fordon was in the parish of Hunmanby and the Wapentake of Dickering. Occupations at the time included three farmers.

References

External links

Villages in the East Riding of Yorkshire